Wynwood is a neighborhood in Miami, Florida. Wynwood is known for being an entertainment district, with artwork, restaurants, breweries, clothing stores, dance venues, among other retail options. Formerly an industrial district, the area is now known for the murals that cover the walls of many of the buildings and much of the sidewalks. It is north of Downtown Miami and Overtown, and adjacent to Edgewater. Wynwood has two major sub-districts, the Wynwood Art District in northern Wynwood, and the Wynwood Fashion District along West 5th Avenue. Wynwood roughly is divided by North 20th Street to the south, I-195 to the north, I-95 to the west and the Florida East Coast Railway to the east.

Wynwood has long been referred to as Little San Juan, and is commonly known as El Barrio, because many Puerto Ricans immigrated to this Miami neighborhood from the island and northeastern cities in the 1950s. Puerto Rican-owned restaurants, shops, markets and other businesses line the streets of Wynwood. Since the early 2000s, the neighborhood has seen a rising amount of investment. The Midtown Miami development construction began in 2005 between North 29th and 36th Street and Miami Avenue and the Florida East Coast Railway (FEC) on what was historically an FEC rail yard. This brought renewed attention to the area, previously abandoned warehouses had begun to be occupied by artists, restaurants, cafés, and lounges. Tony Goldman, a developer, also assisted in the growth of Wynwood by creating a mecca out of the already present graffiti. In 2009, Goldman commissioned artists to create the Wynwood Walls. Located in the Wynwood Art District, this is an outdoor exhibition of rotating street art.

Human geography

Art district
The Wynwood Art District is a sub-district of Wynwood that contains galleries, outdoor murals and private art collections. The district is centered around Wynwood Walls, conceived of by the late urban developer Tony Goldman in 2009. His idea was to revitalize the neighborhood by turning warehouses into works of art. According to the Walls' website, artists featured at Wynwood Walls include: Shepard Fairey, Okuda San Miguel, The London Police, Stelios Faitakis, Clare Rojas, The Date Farmers, avaf, ROA, Ron English, Jeff Soto, Logan Hicks, b., PHASE 2, Joe Grillo, COCO 144, Gaia, Vhils, Interesni Kazki, Brandon Opalka, Friends With You, DALeast, Faith 47, Santiago Rubino, Daze, Maya Hayuk and Lakwena. The Walls were cited as a tourist destination for family fun by Palm Beach Illustrated in 2018. The Walls are curated by Goldman Global Arts, an art dealer that has a gallery inside the wall area.

Fashion district
The Miami Fashion District is a sub-district of Wynwood in Miami, Florida, United States.  It is within the larger neighborhood of Wynwood.  It is bounded by Northeast 30th Street to the north, I-95 to the Northwest, Northwest 23rd Street to the south, and Northwest 2nd Avenue to the east. Its primary artery is along Northwest Fifth Avenue, where a lot of the major clothing retailers and distributors are located.

Technology district
The Wynwood Technology District is a sub-district of Wynwood where various technology companies. In January 2017, Wyncode opened Wynbase, a 3,100-square-foot code dedicated Wynwood campus.

Economy

For some years, the neighborhood has been gentrified with large investments and developments. In 2010, the abandoned Wynwood Free Trade Zone at 2235 NW 5th Avenue was reconverted into a working production studio for films and television shows. In July 2011, production plans were announced for the 2011 Charlie's Angels to be filmed in the old free trade zone building in Wynwood. Other film production studios are located in neighboring Park West, and together, form a larger, growing film production industry in Miami.

Home to a large number of art galleries, artist studios, and clothing wholesalers, the art and fashion industries are the main economic engines of Wynwood. Zak the Baker is a kosher restaurant in Wynwood.

In 2013, Miami New Times moved its headquarters to Wynwood.

Demographics

, Wynwood has a population of 8,621 residents, with 2,754 households in the neighborhood. The median household income in 2015 was $31,256.

Transportation
Wynwood is served by Metrobus and Miami's free trolley service throughout the area, by Metromover's School Board station to the south, and by the Miami Metrorail in adjoining Allapattah less than a mile due west at:

  Allapattah (36th Street/US 27 and NW 12th Avenue)

Education

Public schools
Miami-Dade County Public Schools operates area public schools:

Elementary schools
Eneida Hartner Elementary School
Paul Laurence Dunbar Elementary School
Phyllis Wheatley Elementary School

Middle schools
José de Diego Middle School
Miami Arts Charter School (Wynwood Campus)

High schools
Young Men's Preparatory Academy (all-boys, 6-12th grade)
Miami Arts Charter School (Wynwood Campus)

Higher education
Miami Ad School

Cultural institutions
Bakehouse Art Complex
 The Marguiles Collection at the Warehouse, art
 Rubell Family Collection, art
 Calix Gustav Gallery, art

Parks
Roberto Clemente Park
José de Diego Park (Used by José de Diego Middle School and not available for the general public. Formerly called Robert E. Lee Park. Roberto Clemente is the only truly public park in Wynwood.)

2016 Zika outbreak
In summer 2016, Wynwood experienced a particularly high rate of Zika infection, as part of the 2015–16 epidemic. On August 1, 2016, the Centers for Disease Control and Prevention issued a travel warning, advising pregnant women not to visit the Wynwood, Design District and Midtown Miami areas. This was the first time the CDC had advised against visiting a neighborhood in the United States to avoid catching an infectious disease. 

On August 11, 2016, four more cases of Zika were diagnosed in the Wynwood section of Miami.  This brought the total count in Miami to 21 cases.  All of them were in the Wynwood Section.  Mosquito-control efforts in Wynwood have been difficult because it's a mixed-use area, where industrial sites are located next to a blend of residences and businesses.

The US CDC on December 9, 2016, updated its warnings for 'red areas' ("Zika active transmission areas") and downgraded Wynwood, North Miami Beach, South Miami Beach, and Little River, to a 'yellow area' "where the risk of Zika remains but is no longer greater than that in the rest of Miami-Dade County."

Gallery

See also
 Arts & Entertainment District
 Neighborhoods in Miami
 Gentrification of Miami

References

External links

 Wynwood Food And Graffiti Art Tour

 It's So Miami: Wynwood

Neighborhoods in Miami
Hipster neighborhoods
Puerto Rican culture in the United States